Camponac Médiathèque tram stop is located in Pessac on line  of the tramway de Bordeaux. It was opened on 29 May 2007 during the extension line B from Pessac Bougnard to Pessac Centre.

Situation
The station is located on the avenue Montesquieu in Pessac.

Junctions 
There are no junctions with other tram lines or buses at this station.

Close by

See also 
 TBC
 Tramway de Bordeaux

Bordeaux tramway stops
Tram stops in Pessac
Railway stations in France opened in 2007